Romuald Iosifovich Klim (25 May 1933 – 28 May 2011) was a Soviet hammer thrower. He competed at the 1964 and 1968 Olympics and won a gold and a silver medal, respectively. Klim was awarded the Order of the Badge of Honor in 1965.

Klim was born in a farmer's family. He started training in hammer throw around 1955, but became noticed only in 1963, after winning the Riga Cup and finishing second at the 1963 Soviet Championships. In those years Klim was lighter (ca. 90 kg) and physically weaker than elite Soviet throwers, but he had a strong mental balance and a superior throwing technique; he added weight only after joining the national team. The 1964 Olympics were his first international competitions. After three attempts he was third behind Gyula Zsivótzky and world record holder Hal Connolly, but then threw  and won a surprising gold medal. After that Klim won the 1966 European Championships, the European Cup in 1965 and 1967, and three Soviet Championships (1966–1968). He finished second at the 1968 Games behind Zsivótzky, who had been his main rival all those years. In 1969 Klim finished second at the 1969 European Championships and set his only world record (74.52 m). He retired in 1973 to become an athletics coach and referee. From 1989 until his death he was professor at the Belorussian Academy of Physical Culture and Sports. Since 1976 a hammer throwing competition has been held in his honor in Minsk.

Klim was married and had two twin sons born in 1960.

References

1933 births
2011 deaths
People from Nesvizh District
Soviet male hammer throwers
Belarusian male hammer throwers
Olympic athletes of the Soviet Union
Olympic gold medalists for the Soviet Union
Olympic silver medalists for the Soviet Union
Athletes (track and field) at the 1964 Summer Olympics
Athletes (track and field) at the 1968 Summer Olympics
European Athletics Championships medalists
Armed Forces sports society athletes
Medalists at the 1968 Summer Olympics
Medalists at the 1964 Summer Olympics
Olympic gold medalists in athletics (track and field)
Olympic silver medalists in athletics (track and field)
Sportspeople from Minsk Region